Bowery Electric was an American post-rock band, formed by Lawrence Chandler and Martha Schwendener in 1993.

History 
Formed by Lawrence Chandler and Martha Schwendener in late 1993, Bowery Electric played their first show in New York City in January 1994. The band's debut double 7-inch single was recorded by Kramer and released by Hi-Fidelity Recordings in 1994. After listening to it, Kranky contacted the band.

The band's first album, Bowery Electric, was recorded by Michael Deming at Studio .45 in Hartford, Connecticut and released by Kranky in 1995. The album was included by Andrew Earles in his 2014 book, Gimme Indie Rock: 500 Essential American Underground Rock Albums 1981–1996. In 2016, Pitchfork named it the 36th best shoegaze album of all time.

In 1996, the band released an album, Beat. It includes a single, "Fear of Flying". In 2016, Beat was reissued on vinyl as a 20th anniversary edition by Kranky.

Vertigo, a remix album of tracks from Beat, was released in 1997. Vertigo featured a roster of artists including Third Eye Foundation, Robert Hampson, Witchman and others.

In 2000, the band released an album, Lushlife, which was recorded at Electric Sound. The album peaked at number 14 on the CMJ Top 200 chart and number 11 on the Core Radio chart.

They have not performed or released any recordings as Bowery Electric since.

Musical style 
In the November 1995 issue of The Wire, Simon Reynolds listed Bowery Electric as one of the bands that are "a distinctively American post-rock".

Discography 
Studio albums
 Bowery Electric (Kranky, 1995)
 Beat (Kranky, Beggars Banquet Records, 1996)
 Lushlife (Beggars Banquet Records, 2000)

Remix albums
 Vertigo (Beggars Banquet Records, 1997)

Singles
 "Drop" (Hi-Fidelity Recordings, 1994)
 "Fear of Flying" (Beggars Banquet Records, 1997)
 "Without Stopping - Witchman Mix (Hell or High Water Dub)" (Beggars Banquet Records, 1997)
 "Coming Down - Immersion Mix" (Beggars Banquet Records, 1997)
 "Blow Up" (Happy Go Lucky, 1997)
 "Floating World" (Beggars Banquet Records, 2000)
 "Freedom Fighter" (Beggars Banquet Records, 2000)

See also 
List of ambient music artists

References

External links 
 
 

Musical groups from New York (state)
American post-rock groups
American shoegaze musical groups
Trip hop groups
Male–female musical duos
Musical groups established in 1993